The Saraiki diaspora refers to the dispersing of ethnic Saraikis from Pakistan's Saraiki-speaking region to other parts of the world.

Regions

India
According to the Indian census of 2001, Saraiki is spoken in urban areas throughout northwest and north central India, mainly by the descendants of migrants from western Punjab after the Partition of India in 1947. Out of these, 56,096 persons report their dialect as Mūltānī and by 11,873 individuals report their dialect as Bahāwalpurī. One dialects of Saraiki that is spoken by Indian Saraikis is Derawali, spoken by Derawals in Derawal Nagar, Delhi who migrated to India during the partition. Other dialects spoken by Indian Saraikis include Jafri, Saraiki Hindki, Jhangi, Thali, and Jatki. Many Sairaiki-origin people (whose ancestors once lived in British India) form a distinguished group of doctors, engineers, fashion designers, IT professionals. Some of these people no longer speak the Saraiki language, and have majorly diluted into speaking Punjabi or Hindi.

Outside South Asia
Many Saraiki migrants are in the Middle East, Europe with smaller communities in Australia. In the United Kingdom, Saraiki is spoken by 400,000 and the USA.

See also
Saraikistan
Saraiki people 
List of Saraiki people
Saraiki culture
Saraiki cuisine
Saraiki literature
Pakistani diaspora
Pakistanis in Saudi Arabia

References
10.  Ian Hancock. "On Romani Origins and Identity". RADOC. Retrieved 24 December 2014.    

 
Pakistani diaspora